Elections to Liverpool City Council were held on 1 November 1946.

After the election, the composition of the council was:

Election result

Ward results

* - Councillor seeking re-election

(PARTY) - Party of former Councillor

Due to the disruptions caused by the Second World War, no comparisons are made.

Abercromby

Aigburth

Allerton

Anfield

Breckfield

Brunswick

Castle Street

Childwall

Croxteth

Dingle

Edge Hill

Everton

Exchange

Fairfield

Fazakerley

Garston

Granby

Great George

Kensington

Kirkdale

Little Woolton

No election.

Low Hill

Much Woolton

Netherfield

North Scotland

Old Swan

Prince's Park

Sandhills

St. Anne's

St. Domingo

St. Peter's

Sefton Park East

Sefton Park West

South Scotland

Vauxhall

Walton

Warbreck

Wavertree

Wavertree West

West Derby

By-elections

Aigburth 28 November 1946

On 9 November 1946 the aldermanic vacancy caused by the death of Alderman William Denton (???),
Vere Egerton Cotton C.B.E. (Conservative, elected to the Aigburth ward on 1 November 1946) was elected as an Alderman.

Castle Street 4 February 1947

Alderman John Case died on 1 December 1946.

On 8 January 1947 the Council elected Councillor Herbert Neville Bewley (Conservative )
as an Alderman.

Garston 2 April 1947 

Alderman Sir Sydney Jones died on 16 February 1947.

Councillor Joseph Williams was elected by the Council as an Alderman on 5 March 1947 to fill the vacant post left by the death of Alderman 
Sir Sydney Jones.

North Scotland 29 May 1947

Caused by the resignation of Councillor Thomas Fay(Labour, elected ??? ).

References

1946
1946 English local elections
1940s in Liverpool